Smerinthus kindermannii, the southern eyed hawkmoth, is a species of moth of the family Sphingidae. It is found throughout the central Palaearctic Region, from Turkey, Cyprus and Lebanon, east through Iraq, Iran, Afghanistan and northern Pakistan to Kashmir. From there, north and north-east through Turkmenistan, Uzbekistan, Tajikistan, Kyrgyzstan and Kazakhstan, to north-western China (Xinjiang, Ningxia, Gansu). It has also been reported from Israel and Kuwait.

The wingspan is 70–80 mm. On higher altitudes and in northern Iran and northern Turkey adults are on wing from May to June in one generation. In Lebanon, adults are on wing from early June to mid-September in two generations. In central Asia there are three generations, with adults on wing in March/April, May/June and August/September. In Xinjiang in China there are mostly two generations with adults on wing in May and July/August. In years with a cold end of the spring season, there is only one generation with adults on wing from June to July.

The larvae feed on Salix and Populus species.

Subspecies
Smerinthus kindermannii kindermannii
Smerinthus kindermannii gehleni Eitschberger & Lukhtanov, 1996 (India)
Smerinthus kindermannii iliensis Eitschberger & Lukhtanov, 1996 (Kazakhstan)
Smerinthus kindermannii obsoleta Staudinger, 1901 (China)
Smerinthus kindermannii orbata Grum-Grshimailo, 1890 (Uzbekistan)

External links

Smerinthus
Moths described in 1857
Insects of Turkey